Pilgrimage to Hell is the first book in the Deathlands saga of novels. Written by Christopher Lowder under his pen name Jack Adrian and published on May 1, 1986, it follows the adventures of Ryan Cawdor, Krysty Wroth, and J.B. Dix, and delves into how they met.

Plot
A major character of the saga who appears in this novel is the Trader, who appears occasionally in future novels. It also brings Doc Tanner (a senile-sounding gentleman with knowledge of pre-war America) into the group, and gives us our first glance at one of the series' long-running mutant menaces: stickies.

This book also introduces the redoubts, in particular the Cerberus Redoubt, and the MAT-TRANS teleportation chambers that are a major plot device driving the series.

Characters Introduced/Leaving

 Ryan Cawdor (Introduced)
 Krysty Wroth (Introduced)
 J.B. Dix (Introduced)
 Dr. Theophilus Tanner (Introduced)
 Okie (Introduced)
 Hunaker (Introduced)
 Hennings (Introduced)
 Finnagan (Introduced)
 The Trader (Introduced)

External links
JamesAxler.com

1986 American novels
Deathlands novels
1986 science fiction novels
Harlequin books